Baade is a lunar impact crater that is located near the southwest limb of the Moon on the near side, to the southwest of the enormous Mare Orientale impact basin.  The area to the east of this crater forms the junction between the 280-km-long Vallis Bouvard to the north and the narrower, 160-km-long Vallis Baade to the south-southeast. Both valleys radiate away from the impact basin to the north.

The outer wall of Baade remains sharp-edged, with little appearance of erosion due to subsequent impacts.  The rim is generally circular, with some terracing of the inner wall.  The crater interior is rough and irregular, with a generally bowl-shaped appearance that lacks a sharply defined floor.  There is no central peak at the midpoint of the interior, and no craterlets of note mark the surface.

This crater lies within the Mendel-Rydberg Basin, a 630 km wide impact basin of Nectarian age.

References

External links
 

Impact craters on the Moon